Anna Oleksandrivna Zaporozhanova is a retired Ukrainian tennis player. She reached her highest ranking of world No. 209 in September 2000.

Zaporozhanova won a total of 13 titles on the ITF Women's Circuit and also played on the WTA Tour.

Along with Elena Tatarkova, she represented Ukraine at the 2000 Sydney Olympics in the women's doubles event. The pair beat Taiwan in round one before losing against France.

WTA career finals

Doubles: 2 (runner-ups)

ITF finals

Singles: 8 (4–4)

Doubles: 20 (9–11)

References

External links
 
 

Living people
1979 births
Sportspeople from Kyiv
Ukrainian female tennis players
Olympic tennis players of Ukraine
Tennis players at the 2000 Summer Olympics
21st-century Ukrainian women